Egil Hovland (October 18, 1924 – February 5, 2013) was a Norwegian composer.

Hovland was born in Råde. He studied at the Oslo conservatory with Arild Sandvold and Bjarne Brustad, in Copenhagen with Vagn Holmboe, at Tanglewood with Aaron Copland, and in Florence with Luigi Dallapiccola. He was the organist and choir leader in Fredrikstad from 1949 until his death. His many works include two symphonies, a concerto for trumpet and strings, Music for Ten Instruments, a set of variations for two pianos, and a lament for orchestra. His sacred works include a Norwegian Te Deum, a Gloria, a Magnificat, and numerous works for organ, and he was one of the most noted church composers of Norway.

He wrote in diverse styles, including Norwegian-Romantic, Gregorian, neo-classical, twelve-tone, aleatoric, and serial. In honor of his work as a composer and organist, in 1983 he was knighted into the Royal Norwegian Order of St. Olav. In 1992, he received the Fritt Ord Honorary Award. He was one of the most productive contemporary Norwegian composers.

Compositions

Works for orchestra 
 1951 Festival Ouverture opus 18
 1952–1953 Symphony No. 1—Symphonia Veris opus 20
 1954–1955 Symphony No. 2, opus 24
 1955 Concertino for 3 Trumpets and Strings, opus 23
 1962 Concert Ouverture for orchestra, opus 39b
 1963 Lamenti per orchestra opus 43
 1967 Fanfare and Choral for orchestra, opus 54b
 1968 Lilja—(Salomos høysang) opus 61,  for speaker and orchestra
 1969 Rhapsody for symphony orchestra opus 65
 1970 Symphony No. 3, for reciter, mixed choir, and orchestra, opus 30—Text: from the Bible and O. Medbøe
 1970 The Most Beautiful Rose for speaker, 4 sopranos, orchestra, organ, and piano—Text: Hans Christian Andersen
 1972 Concerto for Trombone and Orchestra, opus 76
 1974 Concerto for Violin and Orchestra, opus 81
 1975 Noël-variations for orchestra, opus 84
 1976–1977 Concerto No.1 for Piano and Orchestra, opus 91
 1978 Tombeau de Bach suite, opus 95
 1980 Intrada opus 105, for mixed choir (SATB), congregation, 2 brass ensembles (3 horns, 3 trumpets, 6 trombones, 2 tubas), orchestra, tympani, percussion, and organ—Text: D. Welander
 1983 Danses de la mort opus 127 for orchestra
 1986 Concerto for Piccolo Flute and Strings, opus 117
 1996 Concerto for Oboe and Orchestra, opus 150
 1996-1997 Concerto for viola and orchestra, opus 153
 2000 De Profundis for baritone und orchestra
 1962/1974 August opus 34 no. 4, for singer and orchestra—Text: J. Handagard

Works for wind ensemble 
 1962 Festival ouverture opus 39a
 1966 Fanfare and Choral for Band opus 54a

Masses, cantatas, and sacred music 
 1962/1979 Gloria opus 40, for mixed choir (SATB), 2 trumpets, 2 horns, 3 trombones and tuba
 1965 Litany for the Feast of the Birth of Christ opus 49, for speaker, soprano, mixed choir (SATB), orchestra and organ - text: S. Ellingsen
 1966-1967 Rorate for 5 sopranos, organ, tape, chamber orchestra and percussion, opus 55
 1967 Choral Cantata on a Norwegian Hymn choral cantata, opus 57, for mixed choir (SATB) and string orchestra
 1967 Missa vigilate opus 59, for solo soprano, solo baritone, mixed choir (SATB), dancers, organ and tape
 1968 Uppståndelsemässa opus 60, for mixed choir (SATB), 2 organs, 3 trumpets, 3 trombones, celebrant, and congregation
 1970 Vox populi IV Introitus- och ordinarie-sånger, opus 68, for children's choir, mixed choir (SATB), congregation, 2 organs, instruments ad lib.
 1970 Allehelgensmesse opus 70, for soprano, mixed choir (SATB), organ, 3 trumpets, 3 trombones, celebrant, congregation  - text: Olav Hillestad
 1971 Missa brevis opus 73, for mixed choir (SATB), organ, celebrant, congregation - text: Olaf Hillestad
 1972/2000 Brønnen church opera in 2 acts, op. 77
 1973 Missa misericordiae for mixed choir, opus 80
 1974 Kyrkans eviga lovsång opus 82, for three mixed choirs, 2 horns, 2 trombones, tuba, bells and organ
 1980 Meditation opus 115, for speaker, mixed choir (SATB), congregation, organ, and orchestra
 1982 Pilgrimsmesse opus 111, for mixed choir (SATB), organ, 3 flugelhorns, 2 horns, 3 trombones, tuba, celebrant, congregation - text: Britt G. Hallqvist / Eyvind Skeie
 1984 Preludier og satser til Inngangssalmer opus 130, for mixed choir (SATB), organ, 2 trumpets, 2 trombones and flute (ad lib)
 1990 Sammen for Guds ansikt opus 143, for mixed choir (SATB), organ, 3 trumpets, 2 horns, 2 trombones, bass trombone and tuba
 1991 Herre, du omgir meg Music for the Opening Procession at the Blessing of King Harald V in the Nidaros Cathedral in Oslo, 23 June 1991, opus 139, for two mixed choirs (SATB), youth choir, 4 horns, 4 trombones, 3 trumpets, organ and tympani
 1991 Dette er dagen som Herren har gjort  Music for the Final Procession at the Blessing of King Harald V in the Nidaros Cathedral in Oslo, 23 June 1991, opus 139, for mixed choir (SATB), 4 horns, 4 trombones, 3 trumpets, organ and tympani
 1994 Diakoni-messe opus 145b, for mixed choir (SATB), 2 trumpets, 2 trombones, organ, congregation and liturgical recitation
 1995 Stå opp, Jerusalem, bli lys Bibelsk salme for mixed choir and instruments (ad. lib.), opus 107, nr 22
 1998 Muziek voor een familie-miss opus 88
 1999 Fred! Det er jeg cantata, opus 165
 2001 Jeg er Herrens tjenerinne for choir, instruments, and joining singers ad lib., opus 146 nr. 6
 Du såg mig Variationer kring psaltarpsalm 139, opus 155, for soprano solo, alto solo, two mixed choirs (SATB), 2 trumpets, 2 trombones, percussion, organ and congregation ad lib
 Missa verbi opus 78,  for mixed choir (SATB), 3 trumpets, 3 horns, 3 trombones, tuba, organ, celebrant, congregation - text: K.Hafstad; Olav Hillestad; J.Smemo
 Stay With Us(orig. 'Bliv hos os') -- from the oratorio or 'church opera' FANGE OG FRI, translated into English as "Captive and Free"—for mixed choir (SATB) and string orchestra

Works for choir 
 1957 The Glory of the Father for mixed choir (SATB) - text: John 1
 1968 How long, o Lord opus 58, for mixed choir - text: Psalm 13
 1986 Return, My Soul motet, opus 87 No 5, for choir (SATB), soprano solo - text: Psalm 116: 7, 5, 8, 3, 4
 1989 Det finnes en dyrebar rose for mixed choir - text: Svein Ellingsen
 1990-1991 Credo opus 137 no 1, for mixed choir
 1993 Min sjel tørster etter Gud Biblical Psalm, for choir (SATB), congregation, ad lib: 2 trumpets, 2 trombones, violin and organ - text: Psalm 42
 Agnus Dei Concerto for bassoon and mixed choir a capella
 Dag over Norge for mixed choir - text: Andreas Hansen
 De salige motet for mixed choir -  text: Matthew 5, 7-8
 De ydmyke : motet for mixed choir -  tekst: Luke 1, 51-53 and 14, 11
 Den som ber, han får for choir (SATB) and organ ad lib. - text: Luke 11, 10, 13
 Herre, vår Herre motet for mixed choir - text: Psalms 8, 2 ; John 3, 14-15
 Hosianna i det høyeste motet for mixed choir - text: Mark 11, 10 ; John 12, 24 ; Isaiah 53, 12
 Jerusalem for mixed choir - text: Luke 19, 42-44  (English translation: Leland B. Sateren)
 Talsmannen, Den Hellige Ånd for mixed choir - text: John 14, 26, 23 and 15, 5
 The Law and the Prophets for mixed choir - text: Bible

Vocal music with piano or organ 
 1962 Gloria opus 40b
 1962 O store Gud vi lover deg Choral cantata, opus 41b, for choir (SATB), organ, congregation  - text: Landstads reviderte salmebok No 31
 1964 Lovad vare Herren, Israels Gud -  text: Luke 1, 68.
 1971 Saul opus 74, for mixed choir (SATB), speaker and organ - text: Bible
 1978 Be with us for mixed choir (SATB) and organ, opus 87 No 3 - text: Luke 24, 29 and Jonah 2:3-10
 Cantate Domino Introit, opus 38
 Gloria in excelsis Deo motet, opus 5 no 1
 Jubilate for mixed choir (SATB), organ, solo singer  - text: Psalms 66, 1-3
 Sing the Joyful Sound for mixed choir (SATB), children's choir, congregation and organ

Chamber music 
 1950 Suite for flute and piano, opus 15
 1959 Suite for flute and percussion, opus 31
 1965 Trio for violin, cello and piano, opus 48

Works for organ 
 1947 Chorale Partita No. 1 opus 7
 1948 Improvisata - Hymnus in Honorem Sancti Magni, Comitis Orcadiæ opus 9
 1954-1956 Suite for Organ No 1 opus 21
 Klippe du som brast for meg
 O bli hos meg
 1959 Chorale Partita No. 3 opus 32
 1965 Elementa pro organo opus 52
 Introitus
 Improvisation
 Ostinato
 Passacaglia
 Completorium.
 1967 Chorale Partita No. 5 opus 56
 1969-1970 Four Interludes to "Missa Vigilate" opus 67
 1973 Job suite no. 2 voor orgel, opus 79
 1973 Nu la oss takke Gud Organ Toccata
 1975 Chorale Partita No. 6 - "Gelobt sei Gott im höchsten Thron" opus 90, on the tune by Vulpius
 1978/1993 Hosanna for organ, opus 135, No. 2
 1979 Crux Ave - Variationen über "Jerusalem, du hochgebaute Stadt" Organ partita VII
 1981 Il canto del mare per organo opus 114
 1982 Cantus V for trombone and organ, opus 120
 1989 Lux aeterna for Organ
 5 Chorale Preludes
 Chorale Partita No. 2 opus 10
 Interlude from the Opera "Brunnen"
 Organ Chorales Volume 1, 2, 3, 4, 5 en 6
 Orgel-Te Deum opus 8
 100 Psalm Preludes

Works for piano 
 1992 Dette er dagen som Herren har gjort Utgangsmusikk ved signingsgudstjenesten i Nidarosdomen 23 June 1991, opus 139
 1995 Getsemane Parafrase for piano over en melodi av Asa Hull, opus 29, no. 5
 In memoriam Paraphrase for Piano on the Hymn "Jordens Gud, stjärnornas Herre", opus 154
 Little Babe opus 29, no. 4
 Rondino for Piano opus 29 no. 2
 Scherzo opus 29 no. 1

Books 
 Norsk Musikforlag: Egil Hovland: Et liv med musikk - (Het leven met muziek). Norsk Musikforlag, Oslo. 1994. 152 pages. 
 Norsk Musikforlag: Festskrift til Egil Hovland på 50-årsdagen, 18 oktober 1974 Norsk Musikforlag, Oslo. 1974. 180 pages
 Egil Hovland: Stay With Us (St. Olaf Choral Series).  Augsburg Fortress Publishers. 2001. 
 David Eugene Tryggestad: A Comprehensive Performance Project in Organ Literature with a Study of the Organ Music of Egil Hovland, The University of Iowa, Iowa City, Iowa. 1984. 77 pages.

References

 Herresthal, Harald. 2001. "Hovland, Egil". The New Grove Dictionary of Music and Musicians, second edition, edited by Stanley Sadie and John Tyrrell. London: Macmillan Publishers.
Johannessen, Geir Harald. 1999. Egil Hovland: Englene danser på tangentene. Oslo: Lunde. .
Kennedy, Michael (2006), The Oxford Dictionary of Music, second edition. Oxford and New York: Oxford University Press.

External links
 , performed by the National Lutheran Choir at the Basilica of Saint Mary, Minneapolis, MN.

Norwegian classical composers
Norwegian classical organists
Male classical organists
Norwegian choral conductors
Male conductors (music)
1924 births
2013 deaths
Composers awarded knighthoods
Musicians from Fredrikstad
People from Råde
20th-century classical composers
Pupils of Vagn Holmboe
Pupils of Aaron Copland
20th-century conductors (music)
Norwegian expatriates in Denmark
Norwegian expatriates in the United States
Norwegian expatriates in Italy